Lodewyk de Jager (born 17 December 1992) is a South African professional rugby union player for the South Africa national team and  in the English Premiership. He usually plays as a lock.

Career

In 2012, he was included in the Leopards' Currie Cup squad, but failed to make an appearance.

He joined the Pretoria-based  on a one-year deal for the 2017 Super Rugby season.

On 24 April 2019 it was announced that he would be joining the Sale Sharks ahead of the 2019–20 Premiership season.

International career

In May 2014, De Jager was one of eight uncapped players that were called up to a Springbok training camp prior to the 2014 mid-year rugby union internationals.

De Jager was named in South Africa's squad for the 2019 Rugby World Cup. South Africa won the tournament, defeating England in the final.

International statistics

Pld = Games Played, W = Games Won, D = Games Drawn, L = Games Lost, Tri = Tries Scored, Pts = Points Scored

International Tries

References

External links
 
 

South African rugby union players
South Africa international rugby union players
Cheetahs (rugby union) players
Free State Cheetahs players
Leopards (rugby union) players
Bulls (rugby union) players
Blue Bulls players
Sale Sharks players
Living people
1992 births
Rugby union locks
Afrikaner people
People from Alberton, Gauteng
Barbarian F.C. players
Rugby union players from Gauteng
Saitama Wild Knights players